Acostia is a genus of South American plants in the grass family.

The only known species is Acostia gracilis, found only in Ecuador. It is listed as an endangered species.
 
The genus name of Acostia is in honour of Misael Acosta Solís (1910–1994), an Ecuadorian naturalist. The Latin specific epithet of gracilis means "slender".
Both the genus and the species were first described and published in Bol. Soc. Argent. Bot. Vol.12 on page 109 in 1968.

See also
List of Poaceae genera

References

Panicoideae
Monotypic Poaceae genera
Endemic flora of Ecuador
Endangered plants
Plants described in 1968